Wellington South and Suburbs was a parliamentary electorate in Wellington, New Zealand from 1887 to 1890.

Population centres
In the 1887 electoral redistribution, although the Representation Commission was required through the Representation Act 1887 to maintain existing electorates "as far as possible", rapid population growth in the North Island required the transfer of three seats from the South Island to the north. Ten new electorates were created, including Wellington South and Suburbs, and one former electorate was recreated.

History
Izard and J. Coombes contested the election, receiving 710 and 454 votes, respectively. Izard had on two occasions previously contested the  electorate without success.

The Wellington South and Suburbs electorate was abolished at the end of the parliamentary term in 1890.  Izard stood in the  electorate in the  but was unsuccessful.

Election results
Key

Notes

References

Historical electorates of New Zealand
Politics of the Wellington Region
1887 establishments in New Zealand
1890 disestablishments in New Zealand